Carpenter's Wood is a   Local Nature Reserve west of Maidenhead in Berkshire. It is owned by the Royal Borough of Windsor and Maidenhead and managed by The Woodland Trust.

The site consists of two adjacent woods, Carpenter's Wood and Dungrovehill Wood. It lost half of its mature beech trees in the storms of 1987 and the early 1990s.

There is access from Dungrovehill Lane.

References

Local Nature Reserves in Berkshire
Bisham